Saved by the Belles, also known by its French title Échappée belles, is a 2003 feature film by Ziad Touma, his first long feature film. Touma is a Lebanese Canadian film director and producer residing in Montreal, Quebec, Canada. Touma is the founder of Couzin Films film, television and digital media production company and it was released through the company.

Synopsis
The film's storyline has a young man rearing his head in Montreal's club milieu, claiming not to remember a thing about his past or who he is. Discovered by local drag diva Sheena Hershey (played by Brian Charbonneau, aka Brian C. Warren) and scenestress Scarlet VJ (played by Karen Simpson), this young amnesiac is soon dubbed "Sean" and taken under wing by the club-junkie duo. Hoping to jar his memory, they take him on a tour of Montreal's club scene, introducing him to various characters along the way; Touma's cast includes numerous authentic night life figures, among them drag fixtures Mado and Madame Simone.

The press kit describes it this way: "Saved by the Belles" stars fags and hags, blonde bimbos, label whores, sugar daddies, club kids, biceps builders, leathers and feathers, funky junkies, freaks and geeks, sex addicts, chupa chicks, lube monsters, pimply pimps, weight watchers, nympho virgins, mingle singles, glowstick ravers, cheap strippers, wannabe actors, guestlist leftovers, glittery debutantes, kinky grannies, impotent hustlers, baggy-eyed scenesters, size queen cupids, self-taught porn stars, air miles jetsetters, showgirls, smoking players, bendable bisexuals and mama's toys.

Cast
Brian Charbonneau ...  Sheena Hershey (as Brian C. Waren) 
Karen Simpson ...  Scarlet 
Steven Turpin ...  Chris 
Danny Gilmore ...  Sean 
Lydia Lockett ...  Magda 
Matt Williston ...  Tobey 
Ron Diamond ...  Doug 
Marcelle Lapierre ...  Edith 
Mado Lamotte ...  Mado  
Dennis O'Brien ...  Dennis 
Varda Etienne ...  Varda 
Terry Sigalas ...  Terry 
Louise Bastien ...  Loulou 
Robert Horble ...  Chicken 
Driss Berki ...  Driss 
Paul Pabello ...  Paul 
Alessandro Mangiarotti ...  Alessandro 
Bernadette Rusgal ...  Bernadette 
Nohémie Renaud ...  Noémie
John Thomas Fraser ...  Sean's Dad

Awards and nominations
A theatrically distributed feature film, Ziad Touma's Saved by the Belles won several awards in festivals around the world.

The film went on to win the Best Feature Film award at Toronto's Inside Out Film and Video Festival in 2003.

In 2004, it was nominated for three Genie Awards for "Best Achievement in Cinematography", "Best Achievement in Art Direction" and "Best Achievement in Music - Original Song".

Saved by the Belles website
"Belles" film led to the launching of a website by Ziad Touma, co-wrote and co-produced with Mouna Andraos and BlueSponge. The website won the "Boomerang Awards" for "Best Arts & Culture Website" and was nominated as "Best Extreme Entertainment Site" at the South by Southwest SXSW Awards.

References

External links
Couzin Films Official website

Telefilm Canada page on Saved by the Belles
savedbythebelles.com website

2003 films
Canadian LGBT-related films
Films set in Montreal
Quebec films
2003 LGBT-related films
Canadian comedy-drama films
LGBT-related comedy-drama films
2000s English-language films
2000s Canadian films